Rigoberto Riasco (11 January 1953 – 29 August 2022) also known as "Little Poison", was a Panamanian professional boxer who competed from 1968 to 1982. He was the Lineal and  WBC Super bantamweight champion in 1976. Riasco defeated such men as Dong Kyun Yum, Leonel Hernández, Rafael Ortega, Waruinge Nakayama, Luis Ávila, Santos Luis Rivera, Seiji "Flipper" Uehara, and Sanjo Takemori.

Professional boxing career
Riasco made his professional debut on 25 August 1968 with a four-round draw with Carlos Mendoza and after winning the featherweight national championship, he fought Alexis Argüello, who defeated him with a second round technical knockout.

After his defeat, he defeated previously unbeaten Luis Ávila and Puerto Rican Santos Luis Rivera, who had knocked him out in the first round in Puerto Rico. Those victories earned him the chance to fight for the newly created WBC championship belt.

On 3 April 1976, Riasco defeated Kenyan Waruinge Nakayama for the WBC and Lineal Super bantamweight titles. He made two successful defenses against Livio Nolasco and Dong Kyun Yum before losing his belt in his third defense against Japanese Royal Kobayashi in Tokyo on October 9, 1976.

He announced his retirement in 1981, but returned later. After three consecutive defeats, Riasco officially announced his retirement in 1982. He left with a record of 29 wins with 13 KOs, 9 losses, and 4 draws.

Professional boxing record

See also
 Lineal championship
 List of super bantamweight boxing champions

References

External links
 

|-

|-

1953 births
2022 deaths
Super-bantamweight boxers
Panamanian male boxers
Sportspeople from Panama City